The Normansfield Theatre is a Victorian era building in Teddington, England.

The theatre is on the site of Normansfield Hospital, which was a self-sufficient Victorian hospital complex run by Dr. John Langdon Down. The hospital was where he conducted the pioneering research into the syndrome now known as Down Syndrome. The theatre was constructed in 1877 and completed in 1879 for the use of the patients.

The theatre is held in care by the Langdon Down Centre Trust. It hosts productions by many different groups, including West London amateur opera company Richmond Opera (formerly Isleworth Baroque).

Work on restoring the previously derelict Grade II* listed building began in 2010. It has now been converted for residential use and the former hospital workshops have been re-developed as social housing. The building has been removed from English Heritage's At Risk register.

It is a popular filming location. It appeared in the Agatha Christie's Poirot episodes "The Tragedy at Marsdon Manor," "The Case of the Missing Will," "Double Sin,"  and "After the Funeral." It was also used in Dorian Gray (2009), the ITV series Downton Abbey, and the Netflix series Bridgerton

References

External links

 Langdondowncentre.org.uk

History of the London Borough of Richmond upon Thames
Teddington
Theatres completed in 1879
Theatres in the London Borough of Richmond upon Thames
1879 establishments in England
Grade II* listed buildings in the London Borough of Richmond upon Thames
Grade II* listed theatres